Arduino Tiraboschi (born 21 August 1951) is an Italian biathlete. He competed in the 20 km individual event at the 1980 Winter Olympics. Tiraboschi also won the Italian biathlon championship on ten occasions.

References

External links
 

1951 births
Living people
Italian male biathletes
Olympic biathletes of Italy
Biathletes at the 1980 Winter Olympics
Sportspeople from the Province of Bergamo